Shravan Reddy is an Indian actor who predominantly works in Hindi television and Telugu films. He made his acting debut in 2007 with Jersey No. 10. He is best known for TV and web series , Dosti... Yaariyan... Manmarziyan, Krishnadasi and Thinkistan. 

Shravan made his film debut in a lead role with the Telugu romantic thriller Dirty Hari.

Early life

Shravan Reddy was born and brought up in Hyderabad, he moved to Mumbai in late 2006 to pursue acting as his career.

Career

He then made his debut as Nakul in SAB TV's Jersey No. 10 in 2007. His competent acting skills garnered him applause, landing him with lead roles in Yahan Ke Hum Sikander(Zee TV) & Mere Ghar Aayi Ek Nanhi Pari(Colors). His versatile acting mettle garnered him good following across the nation thereby bringing him roles like Neil of Dosti... Yaariyan... Manmarziyan on Star Plus in 2015 and Aryan from Krishnadasi on Colors in 2016. His Web Series Thinkistan on Times MX Player was widely popular in 2019 and fetched him a nomination for Best Male actor in FilmFare Indian Web Awards. He signed for Woolmark as a Brand Ambassador. He was part of the Celebrity Cricket Team, Chennai Swaggers on Box Cricket League season 2.

Reddy made his debut as a lead role in a Telugu feature film, Dirty Hari directed by M. S. Raju.

Filmography

Television

Films

Web series

References

External links 

 

21st-century Indian male actors
Male actors in Telugu cinema
Male actors from Hyderabad, India
Indian male television actors
Participants in Indian reality television series
Living people
Year of birth missing (living people)

Male actors in Hindi television
Indian male actors
Indian male film actors
Telugu male actors
Indian soap opera actors